Christian Fiedler (born 27 March 1975 in Berlin) is a German football coach and former football goalkeeper who spent his entire playing career with Hertha BSC.

He is currently the goalkeeper coach of Greuther Fürth.

Football career
Fiedler led Hertha BSC's amateurs to the 1993 Cup final, losing to a lone Ulf Kirsten strike, 15 minutes from time. He started his professional career in the second division, helping the side promote in 1996–97.

For most of his topflight career, however, he was only second-choice to Hertha, successively to Gábor Király and Jaroslav Drobný; his best years came in 2004–07, before the Czech's arrival.

On 2 August 2008, in a test match against Newcastle United, Fiedler sustained a serious injury, which ultimately forced him to retire at the end of the 2008–09 season. On 1 July 2009, he began working as goalkeeper coach for Hertha, having totalled 234 matches (both major divisions combined).

Honours
Hertha BSC
DFL-Ligapokal: 2001, 2002

See also
List of one-club men

References

External links
 
 Christian Fiedler at kicker.de 
 

1975 births
Living people
German footballers
Association football goalkeepers
Bundesliga players
2. Bundesliga players
Hertha BSC players
Hertha BSC II players
Germany under-21 international footballers
Germany youth international footballers
Footballers from Berlin
20th-century German people
West German footballers